Hagwilget Canyon Bridge is a suspension bridge over the Hagwilget Canyon on the Bulkley River, at the Wet'suwet'en village of Hagwilget, British Columbia. The current bridge was constructed in 1931, and later reinforced in 1990. 

Three previous bridges spanned the same location, the first constructed by Wet'suwet'en people, generations before white settlement. The Wet'suwet'en later reinforced their wooden-pole bridge using cable abandoned after the disbandment of the Russian–American Telegraph expedition.

See also 
 List of bridges in Canada

References

External links
Hagwilget Bridge on Tourism BC 

Bridges completed in 1931
Bulkley Valley
Road bridges in British Columbia
Suspension bridges